Fokkens is a surname. Notable people with the surname include:

Jettie Fokkens (born 1975), Dutch volleyball and beach volleyball player
Robert Fokkens, South African classical music composer

Surnames of Dutch origin